Iato may refer to:
IATO, Italian car company
Monte Iato, mountain in Sicily